Persicula hilli is a species of sea snail, a marine gastropod mollusk, in the family Cystiscidae.

References

hilli
Gastropods described in 1950
Cystiscidae